Annan River National Park (also known as Yuku Baja-Mulika) is a national park on Cape York Peninsula in Far North Queensland, Australia. The Annan River from which the park gets its name, marks the northern and western extent of the park. To the east of the park is Walker Bay in the Coral Sea. The park was gazetted in 2006.

It was created to preserve the diversity of lowland vegetation types in the area. These include marine wetlands, eucalypt woodlands and the semi-evergreen vine thickets of the Dowling Range. It also protects places and species of cultural significance to the tradition owners.

Geography
The  park includes several peaks such as Mount Ellen, Mount Mcintosh, Dowlings Hills and Camp Hill. It is bisected by the Mulligan Highway. Annan River National Park lies within the Cape York Peninsula and Wet Tropics of Queensland bioregions.

Management
The park is jointly managed by the Queensland Parks and Wildlife Service and the Yuku Baja-Muliku Land Trust.

Environment

The park provides habitat for the Bennett's tree-kangaroo. The red-tailed Burdekin plum is a fruit-bearing tree of cultural significance.

Facilities
The park has no facilities.

See also

 Protected areas of Queensland

References

National parks of Far North Queensland
Protected areas established in 2006
2006 establishments in Australia